The 2005 Team Ice Racing World Championship was the 27th edition of the Team World Championship. The final was held in Krasnogorsk, in Russia. Russia won their 11th title.

Final Classification

See also 
 2005 Individual Ice Speedway World Championship
 2005 Speedway World Cup in classic speedway
 2005 Speedway Grand Prix in classic speedway

References 

Ice speedway competitions
World